Nicolas Pousset (born May 21, 1979) is a French former ice hockey defenceman.

During his career. Pousset played for Hockey Club de Reims, Dragons de Rouen, Diables Rouges de Briançon, Gothiques d'Amiens, Pingouins de Morzine-Avoriaz and Bisons de Neuilly-sur-Marne. He won three league championships, two with Reims in 2000 and 2002 and a third with Rouen in 2003.

Pousset played in the 2004 IIHF World Championship for France.

References

External links

1979 births
Living people
Bisons de Neuilly-sur-Marne players
Diables Rouges de Briançon players
Dragons de Rouen players
French ice hockey defencemen
Gothiques d'Amiens players
Hockey Club de Reims players
HC Morzine-Avoriaz players
People from Vincennes